As the World is an album by the progressive rock band Echolyn, released in 1995, and it is their only release on a major label (Sony). It features many complex arrangements and vocal harmonies, showing at times the influence of classic progressive rock bands such as Gentle Giant and Genesis.

Album content
"All Ways The Same" is a short instrumental intro featuring a string ensemble arranged and composed by keyboardist Chris Buzby./ The strings are accompanied by vocalizations by Echolyn themselves.

"As The World" begins in A minor with acoustic guitar and vocals with a simple percussion. As bass and drums are added, vocal harmonies come into play, as well as organ continuo by Buzby. Toward the middle of the song, the syncopated vocals and contrapuntal instrumentation may remind the listener of Gentle Giant more so on this song more than most other Echolyn pieces.

Tracks 7 through 11 comprise a suite entitled "Letters". "My Dear Wormwood" is based on The Screwtape Letters by author C.S. Lewis.

The album closer, "Never the Same", is their most requested song to play live. Guitarist/vocalist Brett Kull has commented that while the group is hailed for being extraordinarily "proggy", the song is a relatively simple one in 3/4 time. The song reflects the influences of The Beatles and Simon and Garfunkel more than the oft-cited progressive rock ones.

In 2000, the masters of As the World were returned to the band by record executive Michael Caplan, who originally signed them to Epic Records/Sony Music in 1994. The album was remastered in 2005 by Brett Kull and reissued with new artwork and packaging, plus a bonus DVD of their live performance at The Ritz in Detroit, MI on Saturday, March 4, 1995, just days before the release of As the World. The DVD ends with short interview with Brett and Ray by local rock journalist Devin McPherson. The other bands on the bill that night were fellow prog-rockers Discipline and two thrash bands, Cymonic Drive and Unseasonable Story.

Track listing

Personnel 
Band members
 Christopher Buzby - keyboards, backing vocals
 Tom Hyatt - bass, Midi pedals
 Brett Kull - guitars, lead and backing vocals
 Paul Ramsey - drums, percussion
 Ray Weston - lead and backing vocals

Guest musicians
Orchestra arranged and conducted by Christopher Buzby
Connie Ellisor - strings section leader
Connie Ellisor - violin
Ted Madson - violin
Catherine Ulmstead - violin
Pamela Sixfin - violin
David Davison - violin
Cate Meyer - violin
Katherine Shenk - violin
Carol Ellisor - violin
Jim Grosjean
Alan Ulmstead - viola
Kris Wilkinson - viola
Bob Mason - cello
Sam Levine - piccolo, flute, recorder

Production 
 Produced by Glenn Rosenstein with echolyn
 Mixed by Jeff Balding
 Engineered by Rob Genadek

References

External links 
 
 

1995 albums
Echolyn albums